21st BSFC Awards
December 17, 2000

Best Film: 
 Almost Famous 
The 21st Boston Society of Film Critics Awards honored the best in film of 2000.

Winners

Best Picture 
1. Almost Famous
2. Yi Yi
3. Erin Brockovich

Best Actor 
1. Colin Farrell – Tigerland
2. Javier Bardem – Before Night Falls
3. Tom Hanks – Cast Away
3. Mark Ruffalo – You Can Count on Me

Best Actress 
1. Ellen Burstyn – Requiem for a Dream
2. Laura Linney – You Can Count on Me
3. Julia Roberts – Erin Brockovich

Best Supporting Actor 
1. Fred Willard – Best in Show
2. Jack Black – High Fidelity
3. Albert Finney – Erin Brockovich

Best Supporting Actress 
1. Frances McDormand – Almost Famous and Wonder Boys
2. Julie Walters – Billy Elliot
3. Madeline Kahn – Judy Berlin

Best Director 
1. Cameron Crowe – Almost Famous
2. Edward Yang – Yi Yi
3. Steven Soderbergh – Erin Brockovich and Traffic
3. Michael Winterbottom – The Claim and Wonderland

Best Screenplay 
1. Cameron Crowe – Almost Famous
1. Steve Kloves – Wonder Boys
3. Mike White – Chuck & Buck

Best Cinematography 
1. Peter Pau – Crouching Tiger, Hidden Dragon (Wo hu cang long)
2. Agnès Godard – Beau Travail
3. Alwin H. Kuchler – The Claim
3. Matthew Libatique – Tigerland and Requiem for a Dream

Best Documentary 
1. The Eyes of Tammy Faye
2. The Life and Times of Hank Greenberg
3. Into the Arms of Strangers

Best Foreign-Language Film 
1. Crouching Tiger, Hidden Dragon (Wo hu cang long) • China/Taiwan
2. Yi Yi • Taiwan/Japan
3. The Color of Paradise (Rang-e khoda) • Iran

Best New Filmmaker 
1. Kenneth Lonergan – You Can Count on Me
2. Stephen Daldry – Billy Elliot
3. Eric Mendelsohn – Judy Berlin

External links
Past Winners

References
Four for ‘Famous’ (Boston Crix Pix) Variety
BOSTON CRITICS MAKE IT `FAMOUS' Boston Globe

2000
2000 film awards
2000 awards in the United States
2000 in Boston
December 2000 events in the United States